Frozen Planet is a 2011 British nature documentary series, co-produced by the BBC and The Open University. It was filmed by the BBC Natural History Unit. The production team, which includes executive producer Alastair Fothergill and series producer Vanessa Berlowitz, were previously responsible for the award-winning series The Blue Planet (2001) and Planet Earth (2006), and Frozen Planet is billed as a sequel of sorts. David Attenborough returns as narrator. It is distributed under licence by the BBC in other countries, Discovery Channel for North America, ZDF for Germany, Antena 3 for Spain and Skai TV for Greece.

The seven-part series focuses on life and the environment in both the Arctic and Antarctic. The production team were keen to film a comprehensive record of the natural history of the polar regions because climate change is affecting landforms such as glaciers, ice shelves, and the extent of sea ice. The series was met with critical acclaim and holds a Metacritic score of 91/100.

Whilst the series was broadcast in full in the UK, the BBC chose to make the series' seventh episode, which focuses on climate change, optional for syndication in order to aid sales of the show in countries where the issue is politically sensitive. The US Discovery Channel originally announced that they would air only the first six episodes of the show, but they later added the seventh episode to their schedule.

In 2012, the US broadcast won four Emmy Awards, including Outstanding Nonfiction Series. A sequel titled Frozen Planet II began aring in September 2022, which covers more frozen habitats than just the polar regions, while also emphasizing more on the threat of climate change.

Filming 
Frozen Planet finished filming in 2010 and focused on the challenges facing polar bears and Arctic wolves in the north and Adelie penguins and wandering albatrosses in the south, although many other storylines are developed. After an introductory episode, the subsequent four episodes depict the changing seasons at the poles, before an episode focusing on mankind's activities there. The final episode, "On Thin Ice", examines how global warming is affecting the polar regions. Filmmakers worked in new locations, including Antarctica's active volcanoes and the Russian Arctic. Sequences captured include migrating eider ducks, footage of a fur seal colony from the air, and pack hunting of seals by killer whales. The aerial photography used the Cineflex and Gyron cameras pioneered on Planet Earth, which enable steady footage to be captured from long range without disturbing the animals.

From late April to early May 2009, BBC crews were in Hay River, Northwest Territories, Canada filming the annual breakup of the river of the same name, which flows into Great Slave Lake.

Zoo-filmed material
The BBC was accused of staging after it was reported that one scene of a polar bear giving birth was filmed in a Dutch (initially reported as German) animal park. The BBC defended its faking of the shots, explaining that it would have been impossible to film the event in the wild without endangering the cubs, that the commentary was careful not to mislead the audience, and that the Frozen Planet website had already explained how the scene was captured before the story appeared in the media.

Broadcast 
Frozen Planet was broadcast on BBC One starting 26 October 2011. Each of the first six episodes comprises the main programme followed by a 10-minute featurette called Freeze Frame, which shows how some of the sequences were filmed. David Attenborough's principal role is to narrate the programmes, but he appears briefly on camera to give an introduction and a closing statement. For the seventh programme, "On Thin Ice", he serves as writer and presenter for what was billed by the BBC as a personal statement on the effects of climate change at the poles. A special programme called "Frozen Planet: The Epic Journey" featuring re-edited highlights from the series was broadcast on BBC One on 28 December 2011.

In the United States, Frozen Planet premiered on the Discovery Channel on 18 March 2012 with Alec Baldwin replacing David Attenborough as narrator of the first six episodes. The "Autumn" episode from the BBC series was replaced by "The Making of Frozen Planet", a compilation of the Freeze Frame featurettes, and the title of the sixth episode was changed from "The Last Frontier" to "Life in the Freezer". The network originally decided not to broadcast Attenborough's "On Thin Ice" episode, citing "scheduling conflicts", but later reversed their decision, and "On Thin Ice" was broadcast on Earth Day, 22 April 2012.

In Australia, the series was broadcast on the Nine Network beginning on 27 October 2011.
In France, the series has been acquired by France Television, and aired in March–April 2013 under the name "Terres de Glace".

Episodes
 All episode names from BBC website. Ratings include overnight audience shares, with consolidated viewers supplied by BARB.

Reception

"On Thin Ice" in the United States
Uncertainty surrounded whether the series' seventh episode, which focuses on climate change, would air in the United States, where it is a politically sensitive issue.

In an interview with Radio Times, Attenborough explains that "data from satellites collected over the last 40 years show a drop of 30% in the area of the Arctic sea ice at the end of each summer." Former UK Conservative politician Lord Lawson dismissed the idea as "alarmism", provoking a polar oceanographer working with the show to describe his criticism as "patronising", wrong and the "usual tired obfuscation and generalisation". Attenborough subsequently rebutted Lawson's allegations.

This episode was initially not expected to be shown in the United States. Ten networks that would have run the episode opted out, citing fear of controversy.

On 6 December 2011, the Discovery Channel announced it would air the seventh and final episode of Frozen Planet. "On Thin Ice" includes on-camera shots of Attenborough, who narrates the British version, discussing what shrinking glaciers and rising temperatures mean for people and wildlife that live in the region, as well as the rest of the planet. The music for this episode was composed by Barnaby Taylor.

Ratings
The series quickly became a ratings success in the UK, with the second episode broadcast on 2 November 2011 becoming the highest-rated natural history programme there since 2001. The series drew an average audience of 8.67 million viewers.

Awards
In May 2012, Frozen Planet won in three categories at the British Academy Television Craft Awards, collecting prizes for best sound, best editing, and best photography. At the BAFTA Television Awards, Frozen Planet was nominated for Best Specialist Factual and the YouTube Audience Award, but lost in both categories. It was also nominated for a Royal Television Society award.

The US broadcast won four prizes at the Primetime Creative Arts Emmy Awards in September 2012, including outstanding nonfiction series, cinematography, sound editing, and picture editing. The following month, it won in three categories at the Wildscreen Festival in Bristol, UK, taking the Panda Awards for best sound, best cinematography, and best series, the latter shared with Human Planet. In January 2013, the series won the public vote for Best Documentary Series at the UK's National Television Awards, beating out Big Fat Gypsy Weddings, One Born Every Minute and Planet Earth Live.

Merchandise

DVD and Blu-ray
Three disc region-free Blu-ray and Region 2+4 DVD box sets were released on 8 December 2011, and include the complete series as broadcast in the UK, although  On Thin Ice is considered a special feature on the third disc. In North America, the Blu-ray and Region 1 DVD box sets were released on 17 April 2012, and unlike the Discovery broadcast version, retained David Attenborough's original narration. They also include extra features not present on the UK discs: Frozen Planet: The Epic Journey, an hour-long edited highlights, and Production Video Diaries, a series of 47 video shorts made by the crew as they filmed the series.

Book
Frozen Planet: A World Beyond Imagination accompanies the TV series and was released in hardcover format on 13 October 2011. It is written by the series producers Alastair Fothergill and Vanessa Berlowitz, with a foreword by David Attenborough. The UK version was published by BBC Books and the North American version was published by Firefly Books.

Open University poster
A Frozen Planet poster was produced in collaboration with and distributed for free by The Open University. Both the Arctic Circle and Antarctica are mapped. In addition, detailed profiles of the respective flora and fauna, geology and ice formations are provided as well as timelines of human exploration.

Calendar
Frozen Planet wall calendars were published in the UK for 2012, 2013 and 2014.

Soundtrack

The musical score and songs featured in the series were all composed and conducted by George Fenton, performed by the BBC Concert Orchestra, with the exception of On Thin Ice, its music being composed and conducted instead by Barnaby Taylor. The soundtrack was released on 18 March 2013.

Holland America Line, in partnership with BBC Earth and Lincoln Center Stage, produced a series of concerts based on the BBC Earth Frozen Planet television series. "Frozen Planet in Concert" was performed featuring live musicians directed by Italian music director Sergio Prezioso, playing a specially orchestrated musical score by composer George Fenton as the images unfolded on screen.

References

External links
 
 Frozen Planet at BBC Earth
 Discovery Channel Frozen Planet page
 Frozen Planet on the Eden website
 

BBC television documentaries
BBC high definition shows
Documentary films about nature
Open University
2010s British documentary television series
2011 British television series debuts
2011 British television series endings
Discovery Channel original programming
Television series by BBC Studios
Environment of Antarctica
Arctic
Documentary films about Antarctica